The Colburn Bridge is a historic bridge in Pittsford, Vermont. It is a masonry arch bridge, carrying U.S. Route 7 (US 7) across Sugar Hollow Brook a short way east of the town center. Built in 1899, it is one of a modest number of surviving masonry arch bridges in the state, and exhibits particularly high quality period workmanship. It was listed on the National Register of Historic Places in 1990.

Description and history
It is located near the former home of Charles Colburn, a blacksmith who moved to the area in 1832. Although US 7 is mainly a north–south route, at this point it runs east–west, crossing a gorge cut by the south-flowing Sugar Hollow Brook. The abutments are formed out of rough-cut limestone blocks, while the voussoirs of the arch face are slightly better dressed. The spandrels are faced randomly coursed rough-cut limestone. The bridge originally had limestone railings capped by dressed stone, but these have been removed. In their place are modern metal guardrails, partly set on concrete slabs that cantilever out slightly from the masonry structure.

A bridge has been documented to exist on or near this site since the early 18th century.  The present bridge was built in 1899, and was a gift of Anne Wagner Boardman, wife of Pittsford native Charles Nye Boardman.  At the time of its listing on the National Register of Historic Places in 1990, it was one of seventeen documented masonry arch bridges in the state.  Many older bridges were washed away in the state's devastating 1927 floods, and the state has not generally funded construction of stone arch bridges since 1915.

See also
 
 
 
 National Register of Historic Places listings in Rutland County, Vermont
 List of bridges on the National Register of Historic Places in Vermont

References

Road bridges on the National Register of Historic Places in Vermont
Bridges completed in 1899
Buildings and structures in Pittsford, Vermont
Bridges in Rutland County, Vermont
U.S. Route 7
Bridges of the United States Numbered Highway System
National Register of Historic Places in Rutland County, Vermont
Stone arch bridges in the United States